Mukim Gadong 'A' is a mukim in Brunei-Muara District, Brunei. The population was 34,049 in 2016.

Background 
The mukim was established on 21 November 2005 with split of the former Mukim Gadong into this mukim and Mukim Gadong 'B'.

Geography 
The mukim borders the South China Sea to the north, Mukim Berakas 'A' to the east, Mukim Gadong 'B' to the south and Mukim Sengkurong to the west.

Some of the coastline of Mukim Gadong 'A' has been modified and added with 'land extensions' towards the sea of various shapes and sizes, especially near the surroundings of Pantai Tungku. There are also some small, man-made islands made of rocks and sand with some trees planted on them.

Demographics 
As of 2016 census, the population of Mukim Gadong 'A' comprised 16,859 males and 17,190 females. The mukim had 5,395 households occupying 5,338 dwellings. The entire population lived in urban areas.

Settlements 
Mukim Gadong 'A' encompasses the following villages:
 Kampong Katok
 Kampong Rimba
 Kampong Tungku

It also includes the following public housing estates:
 RPN Kampong Rimba
 STKRJ Kampong Katok 'A'
 STKRJ Kampong Rimba
 STKRJ Kampong Tungku, Area 1 and Area 2

Other locations
Other locations within the mukim include:
 Tungku Beach

See also 
 Public housing in Brunei

References 

Gadong 'A'
Brunei-Muara District